Christopher Hatton Turnor (23 November 1873 – 19 August 1940) was an English author, architect, and social reformer. He is known for having designed the Watts Gallery, Surrey and the Stoneham War Shrine, Hampshire.

Turnor was educated at the Royal Agricultural College, Cirencester and at Christ Church, Oxford. He initially trained as an architect under Edwin Lutyens and Robert Weir Schultz. In addition to his architectural work, Turnor became a campaigner for agricultural reform. He co-founded the Central Landowners' Association.

Published works 
 Land Problems and National Welfare (1911)
 Land settlement after the war (1915)
 Food Supply (1916)
 The Land and the Empire (1917)
 Land settlement for ex-service men in the overseas dominions (1920)
 The Land and its Problems (1921)
 Land settlement in Germany (1935)
 Yeoman calling (1939)

References 

1873 births
1940 deaths
Architects from Gloucestershire
British social reformers
Conservative Party (UK) parliamentary candidates